"Bring 'Em Down" is the first single from Weapons, the fifth studio album by Welsh alternative rock band Lostprophets released on 23 March 2012. It was first played live on 11 August 2011 at O2 Academy Oxford, England. It made its first radio airplay on 6 February 2012. The song impacted US radio on 5 June 2012.

Music video
The video for "Bring 'Em Down" was released on 9 March 2012. The behind the scenes footage was released on 23 March.

The video features Ian Watkins in what is believed to be a hostage situation. The people who have him hostage brutally beat him down continually. As this is happening, the rest of the band members are on a search for rescue of Watkins. They also secretly send off a smokebomb-like device. Reaching Watkins eventually, they take on revenge, as the smokebomb goes off. The video ends with the band victorious and successfully rescuing him. This is the first Lostprophets video not to feature them performing.

Track listing

Chart positions

Personnel
Lostprophets
 Ian Watkins – lead vocals
 Jamie Oliver – piano, synth, keyboard, samples, vocals
 Lee Gaze – lead guitar
 Mike Lewis – rhythm guitar
 Stuart Richardson – bass guitar
 Luke Johnson – drums, percussion

References

Lostprophets songs
2012 singles
2012 songs
Epic Records singles
Electronic rock songs